Jackson Township is one of fourteen townships in Morgan County, Indiana, United States. As of the 2010 census, its population was 3,439 and it contained 1,437 housing units.

History
The Cedar Point Farm, Elm Spring Farm, and Lamb's Creek Bridge are listed on the National Register of Historic Places.

Geography

Cities, towns, villages
 Morgantown
 Painted Hills

Cemeteries
The township contains these three cemeteries: Gerholt, Nast Chapel and Williams.

Major highways
  Indiana State Road 135
  Indiana State Road 252

Lakes
 Tall Oaks Lake
 Whitley Lake
 Little Nebo Lake
 Painted Hills Lake

School districts
 Nineveh-Hensley-Jackson United

Political districts
 Indiana's 4th congressional district
 State House District 47
 State Senate District 37

References
 
 United States Census Bureau 2008 TIGER/Line Shapefiles
 IndianaMap

External links
 Indiana Township Association
 United Township Association of Indiana
 City-Data.com page for Jackson Township

Townships in Morgan County, Indiana
Townships in Indiana